Eurycnemus crassipes is a species of nonbiting midges in the subfamily Orthocladiinae. It is found in Norway.

References

External links 
 
 Eurycnemus crassipes at gbif.org

Chironomidae
Insects described in 1813
Fauna of Norway
Diptera of Europe
Taxa named by Johann Wilhelm Meigen